Stigmella maya is a moth of the family Nepticulidae. It is found on the Yucatán Peninsula of southeastern Mexico.

This species is among the smallest Lepidoptera in the world.

The larvae feed on Karwinskia humboldtiana. They mine the leaves of their host plant.

References

Moths described in 2013
Nepticulidae
Moths of Central America